The Melka Wakena Power Station is a hydroelectric power plant of the Wabe Shebelle River in  Ethiopia. It has a power generating capacity of  enough to power over 100,300 homes. The Melka Wakena Power Station was built in 1988 over an active archeological site.

See also

 Energy in Ethiopia

References

Melka Wakena
Hydroelectric power stations in Ethiopia
Soviet foreign aid
Ethiopia–Soviet Union relations